James Crichton (1560–1582) was a Scottish polymath.

James Crichton may also refer to:

 James Crichton (soldier) (1879–1961), Irish-born New Zealand recipient of the Victoria Cross 
 James G. Crichton (born 1893), American Republican politician in the California legislature
 James Crichton of Frendraught, Scottish landowner involved in tragic fire in 1630
 James Crichton, 1st Viscount Frendraught (died c. 1664/65), Scottish peer